Kathy Vogt (born March 7, 1959) is an American-born Canadian speed skater. She competed at the 1976 Winter Olympics and the 1980 Winter Olympics.

Personal life
Vogt married Canadian hockey player Randy Gregg on June 9, 1984 in Edmonton. They have four children: Ryan, Sarah, and speed-skaters Jessica Gregg, and Jamie Gregg. Vogt and her family reside in Edmonton, Alberta.

References

External links
 

1959 births
Living people
American emigrants to Canada
Canadian female speed skaters
Olympic speed skaters of Canada
People from Elkhart, Indiana
Speed skaters at the 1976 Winter Olympics
Speed skaters at the 1980 Winter Olympics
Sportspeople from Indiana